Doonby is a 2013 independent film written and directed by Peter Mackenzie. It stars John Schneider, Jenn Gotzon, Ernie Hudson, Jennifer O'Neill, Will Wallace, Robert Davi and Joe Estevez.

Plot summary
Sam Doonby (John Schneider) is a mysterious drifter who gets off a bus one afternoon in a small Texas town to change and improve the lives of all he comes in contact with. It is a story of greed and envy, played out against the backdrop of the classic country and blues music that is performed in Leroy’s Bar. The film has been described by the producers as Crazy Heart-meets-It's A Wonderful Life, while Schneider described it as "It's A Wonderful Life without the Wonderful."

Cast
John Schneider as Sam Doonby
Jenn Gotzon as Laura Reaper
Ernie Hudson as Leroy
Robert Davi as Sheriff Woodley
Jennifer O'Neill as Barbara Ann
Will Wallace as Tony
Joe Estevez as Cyrus

Production
The film was shot on location in Smithville, Texas.

Release
Doonby was previewed during the 64th annual 2011 Cannes Film Festival.
It received a limited release in February 2012 to be followed by wider release in the United States during the spring. The film was given wide release on February 17, 2012 by Freestyle Releasing In 2014 distribution company CMD Distribution obtained DVD distribution rights.

Reception
Doonby resonated with many anti-abortion organizations due to its anti-abortion theme. Activist Norma McCorvey (1947-2017), known as the plaintiff Jane Roe of the Supreme Court landmark decision Roe v. Wade which legalized abortion in the United States in 1973, appeared in a cameo in the film. It has also been endorsed by the Vatican and has premiered at the Landmark E Street Cinema during the 2013 March for Life, an annual anti-abortion march protesting abortion in the United States.

References

External links
 
 

2013 independent films
American independent films
Films about abortion
Films shot in Texas
Films set in Texas
2010s English-language films
Films produced by Mark Joseph (producer)
2010s American films